Paul Francis McGuigan (born 9 May 1971), known professionally as Guigsy (pronounced "Gwigzee"), is an English retired musician. He is best known as the bassist and co-founder of the British rock band Oasis.

Career
In the late 1980s, McGuigan started a band called The Rain with Paul "Bonehead" Arthurs on guitar, Chris Hutton on lead vocals, and Tony McCarroll on drums. After Hutton was fired, McGuigan invited his school friend Liam Gallagher to join on vocals. Liam's brother Noel then joined the band as a guitarist and the primary songwriter, at which point they changed their name to Oasis. Though a functional bassist onstage, McGuigan's bass parts were occasionally played by Noel on the band's first two albums. Despite a rumour that McGuigan did not play bass on Definitely Maybe and that his and Bonehead's parts were replaced by Noel on the first two albums, this has been denied by the band's producer Owen Morris. Like the other band members, McGuigan said he has smoked a lot of weed during touring.

McGuigan left Oasis in 1999 and was replaced by then-former Ride frontman and guitarist Andy Bell as bassist. Noel claims that McGuigan quit via fax and avoided phone calls from the band in the following weeks. Though he eventually gave up trying to contact McGuigan, Noel said he does not hold any grudges. McGuigan occasionally performs as a DJ. He declined to appear in the 2004 Definitely Maybe DVD, although a polite letter explaining his reasons for doing so appears as a hidden extra and there is also a short segment featuring pundits giving their views on him. He also declined to be interviewed for the 2016 Oasis: Supersonic documentary, though archive footage of him was used instead.

McGuigan said of his playing style in 1995, "When I first started I just played up and down the top string of the bass. Come to think of it, that's what I still do now."

Personal life
An avid sports fan, McGuigan especially loves football and is a lifelong supporter of Manchester City FC. In 1996, he told Rolling Stone "watching football is my main hobby. Watching football, watching videos about football, reading about football and talking about football. That's pretty much all I care about". In the 2016 documentary Oasis: Supersonic, Noel Gallagher quipped that being in Oasis was a "lowly fifth" on the list of McGuigan's favourite things after "cricket, Doctor Who, weed, and Man City".

McGuigan is renowned for his encyclopaedic knowledge of football and cricket. During a BBC Radio 1 interview in 1995, he named FourFourTwo as his favourite magazine. Whilst still with Oasis, he co-wrote a book with journalist Paolo Hewitt about football player Robin Friday, entitled The Greatest Footballer You Never Saw.

References

External links
Paul McGuigan interview from FourFourTwo football magazine (December 1997)
1998 Interview
Toazted Interview (part 2)

1971 births
Living people
English rock bass guitarists
Male bass guitarists
Musicians from Manchester
Oasis (band) members
Britpop musicians
British rock bass guitarists
20th-century English bass guitarists
21st-century English bass guitarists